Grady Sizemore (born August 2, 1982) is an American former professional baseball outfielder. He played in Major League Baseball (MLB) for the Cleveland Indians from 2004 through 2011, but did not play in the majors for the following two years after back and knee injuries. He returned in 2014 with the Boston Red Sox and played for the Philadelphia Phillies from 2014 to 2015 before finishing 2015 with the Tampa Bay Rays. He was a three-time MLB All-Star and a two-time Gold Glove Award winner, and also won a Silver Slugger Award.

Early life
Sizemore graduated from Cascade High School in Everett, Washington, in 2000. A high school athlete in football, basketball and baseball, Sizemore signed a letter of intent to play football and baseball at the University of Washington. At the time of his high school graduation, Sizemore was Cascade's all-time leader in rushing yards, with 3,081. Sizemore graduated from high school with a 3.85 GPA.

Professional career

Draft and minors
The Montreal Expos selected Sizemore in the third round of the 2000 Major League Baseball draft. The team offered him a $2 million signing bonus to lure him away from college, to which Sizemore agreed.

On June 27, 2002, the Expos traded Sizemore, along with Cliff Lee, Brandon Phillips and Lee Stevens, to the Cleveland Indians in exchange for Bartolo Colón and Tim Drew.

Cleveland Indians

2004–2007

Sizemore made his Major League debut on July 21, 2004. He finished the rest of the season with a .246 average, 4 home runs, and 26 RBI in 43 games played. In 2005, Sizemore played his first full season in the majors. He quickly established himself as one of baseball's up and coming stars in center field. He was named the leadoff hitter of the Indians' lineup. He was supposed to play in Triple-A, but Juan González' injury in the first game of the season secured his spot in the major leagues. He also joined Roberto Alomar as the only players in franchise history to record 20 doubles, 10 triples, 20 home runs and 20 stolen bases in the same season. Sizemore's best month came in June when he hit .377 (40–106) with four home runs and 16 RBIs in 25 games. He finished the season batting .289 with 22 home runs, 81 RBIs, and 22 stolen bases. Before the start of the 2006 season, Sizemore signed a six-year contract with the Indians worth $23.45 million with a club option for 2012.

In 2006, Sizemore was selected to his first All-Star Game as a reserve outfielder. Overall that season, Sizemore played in all 162 games and batted .290 with 28 home runs, 76 RBIs, and a .907 OPS. His 53 doubles, 92 extra-base hits and 134 runs scored led the majors. In addition, he became the second in MLB history to have at least 50 doubles, 10 triples, 25 home runs, and 20 stolen bases in a single season; the first was Chuck Klein in 1932.

Sizemore opened 2007 by hitting four home runs in his first six games. He hit a three-run inside-the-park home run on April 27. The May 14 issue of Sports Illustrated magazine featured Sizemore on the cover. In the cover article, Indians' general manager Mark Shapiro calls Sizemore "without a doubt one of the greatest players of our generation".

On July 1, he was named to his second All-Star team. In 2007, he had 24 home runs, and was 33–10 in stolen base attempts. He was one of six batters in the AL to have at least 20 home runs and 20 stolen bases, along with Alex Rodriguez, Gary Sheffield, Ian Kinsler, B.J. Upton, and Curtis Granderson. On November 6, it was announced that Sizemore had earned his first Gold Glove, after he posted a .995 fielding percentage with two errors and displaying his reputation for great range in center field and acrobatic catches.

2008
Sizemore's streak of 382 consecutive games played ended on April 27 due to a sprained ankle sustained the preceding day. On July 2, Sizemore hit his twentieth home run and stole his twentieth base, marking his fourth straight 20–20 year. He was the only AL hitter to hit at least 20 home runs and steal at least 20 bases each year during 2005–08.

He was named to the American League All-Star Team for the third consecutive year, and participated in the 2008 Home Run Derby where he hit six home runs, but did not advance to the second round. Sizemore participated in the 2008 All-Star Game and he played 11 innings as the game extended into the 15th inning.

On August 21, Sizemore hit his 29th home run of the season against the Kansas City Royals, setting a new career high. On August 25, Sizemore hit his 30th and 31st home run against Armando Galarraga of the Detroit Tigers, becoming the 32nd member of the 30–30 club.

For his efforts in 2008, Sizemore was awarded his second consecutive Gold Glove (his .995 fielding percentage was second among AL center fielders). He was also awarded his first Silver Slugger Award. He led the major leagues in power-speed number (35.3).

2009 season
Sizemore committed to play in the 2009 World Baseball Classic, but pulled out after injuring his left groin early in spring training. On April 16, Sizemore hit the first grand slam home run at the new Yankee Stadium off New York reliever Dámaso Marte. It was his third career grand slam.

On September 9, after struggling through a subpar season, Grady elected to have surgery on his left elbow which had troubled him since spring training. Having the surgery performed one month before season's end allowed for more healing time and preparation for the following year. Cleveland was already eliminated from playoff contention by the time of his decision. One week after the elbow surgery, he also elected to have surgery on his lower abdomen to repair a hernia that was related to the groin injury which forced him from the World Baseball Classic, thus ending his 2009 season one month before the final game.

2010–2013
After playing in 33 games, Sizemore's season ended after microfracture surgery was performed on his left knee.

Sizemore returned to the Cleveland Indians from his microfracture surgery, after rehabilitating with Triple-A Columbus Clippers, on April 17, 2011. Sizemore went 2-for-4 with a double and home run. The Indians won the game 4–2. Sizemore returned to the disabled list in May with a right knee contusion after sliding into a base. In mid-July, Sizemore was again placed on the disabled list following another injury to his right knee; shortly afterwards, he had a second sports hernia surgery, expected to sideline him into September.  Through 2011, he had the third-best career fielding percentage of all active major league outfielders (.9935), behind Shane Victorino and Ryan Braun. The Indians declined Sizemore's 2012 contract option.

After meeting with both the Boston Red Sox and Seattle Mariners during the offseason, Sizemore re-signed with Cleveland, signing a one-year, $5 million contract. Sizemore underwent back surgery during Spring training, and began the season on the 60-day disabled list. A series of setbacks in his recovery from back and knee surgeries prevented him from appearing in any games during the season. Sizemore had microfracture surgery on his right knee in September, after a previous arthroscopic procedure in 2011 was unsuccessful in healing his ailing knee. Grady Sizemore remained a free agent through the 2013 MLB season. According to his agent, Joe Urbon, Sizemore did not want to commit to a team until he was ready to play again.

Boston Red Sox
On January 22, 2014, Sizemore signed with the Boston Red Sox. The contract was for one year with a base salary of $750,000, with incentives that would increase the total to up to $6 million. On March 28, Sizemore was named the team's starting center fielder for the season opener after beating out Jackie Bradley Jr. in spring training. On opening day against the Baltimore Orioles he hit a solo shot just over the right field scoreboard. He also hit a 3-run home run against former teammate CC Sabathia in the game versus the New York Yankees on April 11. On June 17, Sizemore was designated for assignment to make room for top prospect Garin Cecchini. The next day on June 18, the Red Sox officially released Sizemore. For his brief time in Boston, Sizemore made $1.25 million.

Philadelphia Phillies
On June 24, 2014, Sizemore signed a minor league deal with the Philadelphia Phillies. On July 11, Sizemore was recalled from Lehigh Valley in order to join the Phillies rotation of outfielders. On July 25, Sizemore collected his 1,000th career hit, in a game against the Arizona Diamondbacks. After a successful start, Phillies general manager Rubén Amaro Jr. suggested Sizemore could be part of the Phillies longer-term plans if his success continued. He was signed to a one-year contract for the 2015 season on October 23. He collected 4 hits in one game against the Diamondbacks on May 16, 2015. Sizemore was designated for assignment by the Phillies on May 29, 2015. He was released on June 1, 2015.

Tampa Bay Rays

On June 15, 2015, Sizemore signed a minor league deal with the Tampa Bay Rays. He became a free agent at the end of the 2015 season and did not play in 2016.

Post-playing career
In February 2017, the Indians hired Sizemore as an advisor to the team's player development department.

See also

 Cleveland Guardians award winners and league leaders
 List of Major League Baseball annual doubles leaders
 List of Major League Baseball annual runs scored leaders
 List of people from Everett, Washington

References

External links

Grady Sizemore: The Playmaker, Young Money, 2008

1982 births
Living people
Cleveland Indians players
Boston Red Sox players
Philadelphia Phillies players
Tampa Bay Rays players
Gulf Coast Expos players
Clinton LumberKings players
Brevard County Manatees players
Kinston Indians players
Akron Aeros players
Team USA players
Buffalo Bisons (minor league) players
Columbus Clippers players
Lehigh Valley IronPigs players
Charlotte Stone Crabs players
American League All-Stars
Baseball players from Seattle
Gold Glove Award winners
Major League Baseball center fielders
Silver Slugger Award winners